Macedo is a Portuguese language surname that may refer to:

People
Amaro Macedo (1914–2014), Brazilian botanist 
António de Macedo (1931–2017), Portuguese film director
António Macedo (painter) (born 1955), Portuguese painter
Carlos Macedo (born 1965), Portuguese actor
Diane Macedo (born 1982), American journalist
Donaldo Macedo (born 1950), American scholar
Edir Macedo (born 1945), Brazilian religious leader
Felipe Macedo (born 1994), Brazilian football player
Francisco Macedo (1596–1681), Portuguese theologian
Isabel Macedo (born 1975), Argentine actress
Jean Carlos Macedo da Silva (born 1980), Brazilian football player
Joílson Rodrigues Macedo (born 1979), Brazilian football player
John Macedo (born 1985), British dark ambient musician
José Macedo Vieira (born 1949), Portuguese politician
Leandro Macedo (born 1968), Brazilian athlete
Luis de Llano Macedo (born 1945), Mexican television producer
Macedo Novaes (born 1983), Brazilian football player
Manuel Lepe Macedo (1936–1984), Mexican artist
Marcos Macedo (born 1990), Brazilian swimmer
Michel Macedo (born 1990), Brazilian football player
Miguel Macedo (born 1959), Portuguese politician
Mirta Macedo (1939 - 2012), Uruguayan writer
Natanael dos Santos Macedo (born 1969), Brazilian retired football player
Paulo Macedo (born 1963), Portuguese politician
Paulo Macedo (basketball) (born 1968), Angolan basketball coach
Rafael Macedo de la Concha (born 1950), Mexican general
Rita Macedo (1925–1993), Mexican actress
Stephen Macedo (born 1957), American political scientist
Veronica Macedo
Watson Macedo (1918–1981), Brazilian filmmaker

Places
Coronel Macedo, Brazil
Dom Macedo Costa, Brazil
Macedo de Cavaleiros, Portugal
Macedo do Mato, Portugal
Macedo Dr. Mission Viejo, California

Other uses
Macedo (musical group)

See also 
de Macedo

Portuguese-language surnames